Baranophrys is an extinct genus of prehistoric amphibian of questionable taxonomic status. It is known from Villány, Hungary.

See also
 Prehistoric amphibian
 List of prehistoric amphibians

References

Pleistocene amphibians
Quaternary amphibians of Europe
Fossil taxa described in 1956